Animal rights is the idea that the most basic interests of non-human animals should be given the same consideration as the similar interests of human beings.

Animal rights may also refer to:

 Animal Rights (album), a 1996 album by Moby
 Animal Rights (instrumental), a 2010 instrumental by deadmau5 and Wolfgang Gartner
 Animals' Rights, an 1892 book by the English social reformer Henry Stephens Salt

See also 
 Animal rights movement
 
 
 Animal liberation (disambiguation)